Kampfgruppe is a 1985 computer wargame designed by Gary Grigsby and published by Strategic Simulations for the Apple II, Atari 8-bit family, and Commodore 64. Kampfgruppe is a game tactical-scale combat on the Eastern Front. An MS-DOS port was released in 1987 followed by an Amiga version in 1988.

Gameplay

Development
Kampfgruppe was designed by Gary Grigsby and released in 1985, the same year he launched U.S.A.A.F. - United States Army Air Force and Mech Brigade. He chose to incorporate line of sight in Kampfgruppe, a first for a Strategic Simulations title. Its design has been compared to that of PanzerBlitz; J. L. Miller of Computer Play dubbed it "the computer version of PanzerBlitz".

Reception

Kampfgruppe was a commercial hit. By late 1985, it had sold 8,000 units and was forecast to reach 25,000 sales over its lifetime. It was widely acclaimed by fans of the wargame genre.

Computer Gaming Worlds Mark Bausman called Kampfgruppe a "truly superior game" that allowed the player to "exercise his imagination without having to follow a complicated game structure." In Current Notes, M. Evan Brooks called Kampfgruppe an "instant classic" and offered it his "highest recommendation".

In 1985, Computer Gaming Worlds readers voted Kampfgruppe the best game of the year across all categories. The magazine's editors concurred that it was "the finest wargame currently available", and argued that it would "be looked back upon as a true landmark effort in computer wargaming."

Legacy
Kampfgruppe was among the first inductees into Computer Gaming Worlds "Hall of Fame" section in 1988, and remained readers' highest-rated strategy title by that time. In 1996, Computer Gaming World declared Kampfgruppe the 101st-best computer game ever released. The magazine's wargame columnist Terry Coleman named it his pick for the eighth-best computer wargame released by late 1996. In his 1989 computer wargame survey, J. L. Miller of Computer Play dubbed Kampfgruppe a "classic".

SSI later released the Kampfgruppe Scenario Disk, which adds five scenarios to the game.

References

External links

Kampfgruppe at Atari Mania
Kampfgruppe at Lemon Amiga
Article in Tilt (French)

1985 video games
Amiga games
Apple II games
Atari 8-bit family games
Commodore 64 games
Computer wargames
DOS games
Strategic Simulations games
Turn-based strategy video games
Video games about Nazi Germany
Video games developed in the United States
Video games set in the Soviet Union
World War II video games